George Dyer may refer to:

 George Dyer (poet) (1755–1841), English classicist and writer
 George Dyer (politician) (1802–1878), American physician and politician
 George P. Dyer (1876–1948), American football coach
 George R. Dyer (1869–1934), American military officer and chairman of the Port Authority of New York
 George Dyer (model) (c. 1933–1971), English burglar, lover and model of artist Francis Bacon
 George Leland Dyer (1849–1914), American naval commander and governor of Guam
 George Dyer (rugby union) (born 1999), New Zealand rugby union player

See also
 George Dyer Weaver (1908–1986), Canadian politician, member of the House of Commons of Canada
 Three Studies for George Dyer, a small-format triptych painted by Francis Bacon in 1964
 Portrait of George Dyer Talking, an oil painting by Francis Bacon executed in 1966
 Portrait of George Dyer and Lucian Freud, an oil on canvas painting by Francis Bacon executed in 1967